John Cochran may refer to:

 John Cochran (cricketer) (1909–1987), South African cricketer
 John Cochran (fl. 1680s), Scottish negotiator for land purchase for Stuarts Town, Carolina in 1684
 John Cochran (physician) (1730–1807), American Revolutionary War military physician
 John Cochran (artist) (fl. 1821–1865), British portrait miniaturist and engraver
 John J. Cochran (1880–1947), US Representative from Missouri
 John P. Cochran (1809–1898), Governor of Delaware
 John P. Cochran, Dean, School of Business at Metropolitan State College of Denver
 John Cochran (Australian politician) (1864–1926), member of the New South Wales Legislative Assembly
 Johnnie Cochran (1937–2005), American attorney
 John Cochran (Survivor contestant) (born 1987), American television personality

See also
 Jackie Cochran (disambiguation)
 John Cochrane (disambiguation)